Pangaimotu may refer to two islands in Tonga:

 Pangaimotu (Vavaʻu)
 Pangaimotu (Tongatapu)